Sumati or Sumathi may refer to:

 Sumathi (actress) (born 1964), popular Tamil actress
 Sumati Kshetramade (1913–1997), Indian Marathi writer
 Sumati Morarjee (1909–1998), Indian shipowner
 Sumathi Murthy, Indian vocalist, composer, and activist
 Sumati Mutatkar (1916–2007), Indian vocalist and musicologist
 Sumati Oraon, Indian politician
 Sumati (astronomer) (6th-10th century AD), Nepali astronomer
 Sumatinatha, 5th Jain Tirthankara
 Sumati (mythology), mother of 60,000 sons of King Sagara in Hindu mythology
 Sumati, also known as Sumedha, a previous life of the Buddha
 Sumathi Satakam, a type of Telugu poetry written by Baddena
 Sumathi (1942 film), a Telugu film